Apomempsoides trispinosa is a species of beetle in the family Cerambycidae. It was described by Karl Jordan in 1894, originally under the genus of Apomempsis.

References

Morimopsini
Beetles described in 1894